The D. A. "Andy" Anderson Arboretum (17 acres), originally named the Brazos County Arboretum, is an arboretum located at 1900 Anderson Street, College Station, Texas. It is open daily without charge.

The arboretum was created in 1976 by the city as part of the USA Bicentennial celebration, and renamed in 1986 to honor former Mayor Andy Anderson. It borders on Bee Creek, and contains a shelter and an interpretive trail system that describes native Texas plants.

External links 
 D. A. "Andy" Anderson Arboretum

 

Anderson Arboretum
Protected areas of Brazos County, Texas